Monastyrsky , a surname and rural localities in Russia, may refer to:

People 
 Andrei Monastyrsky (born 1949), a Russian artist and author
 Boris Monastyrsky (1903–1977), a Soviet cameraman
 Denys Monastyrsky (1980–2023), a Ukrainian politician
 Moisei Monastyrsky (1879–1919), a politician, revolutionary
 Pyotr Monastyrsky (1915–2013), a Soviet and Russian theater director, actor, teacher, publicist

Localities 
 Monastyrsky, Bryansk Oblast, a settlement
 Monastyrsky, Medvensky District, Kursk Oblast, a khutor
 Monastyrsky, Oboyansky District, Kursk Oblast, a khutor
 Monastyrsky, Samara Oblast, a settlement
 Monastyrsky, Saratov Oblast, a settlement
 Monastyrsky, Tula Oblast, a settlement

See also
 Monastyr, a game